Pierre-Louis Thévenet was a French production designer, art director and set decorator.

Awards
He won an Academy Award in the category Best Art Direction for the film Patton (1970).
He won a Goya Award for Best Art Direction for the film Goya in Bordeaux (1999).

Selected filmography
 Patton (1970)

References

External links

French production designers
French set decorators
Best Art Direction Academy Award winners
Year of birth missing (living people)
Living people
French art directors